The Bird with the Crystal Plumage is a 1970 giallo film directed by Dario Argento, in his directorial debut. The film has been credited with popularizing giallo, an Italian genre of thriller developed in the 1960s. It is the first in what has been called the "Animal Trilogy", along with Argento's next two gialli, The Cat o' Nine Tails (1971) and Four Flies on Grey Velvet (1972) (though the three films are connected only by their titles).

Written by Argento, the film borrowed liberally from Fredric Brown's novel The Screaming Mimi.

The film was an international commercial and critical success.

Plot
Sam Dalmas is an American writer vacationing in Rome with his English model girlfriend, Julia. Suffering from writer's block, Sam is on the verge of returning to America but witnesses the attack of a woman in an art gallery by a mysterious black-gloved assailant dressed in a raincoat.

Attempting to reach her, Sam is trapped between two mechanically-operated glass doors and can only watch as the villain makes his escape. The woman, Monica Ranieri (the wife of the gallery's owner Alberto Ranieri), survives the attack and the local police confiscate Sam's passport to stop him from leaving the country. The assailant is believed to be a serial killer who is killing young women across the city, and Sam is an important witness.

Sam is haunted by what he saw that night, feeling sure that some vital clue is evading him, and he decides to help Inspector Morosini in his investigation. He interviews the pimp of a murdered prostitute and visits a shop where one of the victims worked. There, Sam finds that the last thing she sold on the day of her death was a painting of a stark landscape featuring a man in a raincoat assaulting a young woman. He visits the artist but finds only another dead end. As he makes his way back to his apartment, a black-gloved figure attacks Julia, but Sam arrives home just in time to save her, and the assailant escapes.

Sam starts to receive threatening phone calls from the killer. The police manage to isolate an odd cricketing noise in the background, which is later revealed to be the call of a rare breed of bird from Siberia called "The Bird with Crystal Plumage" due to the translucent glint of its feathers. This clue proves crucial since the only one of its kind in Rome is kept in the Italian capital's zoo, allowing Sam and the police to identify the killer's abode. They once again find Monica Ranieri struggling with her husband Alberto, who is wielding a knife. After a short struggle, Alberto drops from six stories onto a concrete sidewalk below. As he dies, he confesses to the murders and tells them he loves his wife.

Finding that Julia and Monica have run off, Sam goes after them, eventually coming to a darkened building. He finds his friend Carlo murdered and Julia bound, gagged, and wounded. The assailant emerges and is revealed as Monica Ranieri. Sam suddenly realizes that he didn't miss anything during the first attack; Sam misinterpreted what he saw: the attack he witnessed in the gallery was not Monica being assaulted but Monica attacking her husband, who was wearing the raincoat. She flees, and he pursues Monica to her art gallery. There he is trapped, pinned to the floor by the release of a wall-sized sculpture of wire and metal. Unable to free himself, he is teased by the knife-wielding Monica as she prepares to kill him. As she raises her knife, the police (who were notified by Julia, who escaped) burst in and apprehend her. Sam is freed, and Monica is taken to a psychiatric hospital.

It is revealed through an interview with a psychiatrist that Monica was the victim of a traumatic attack ten years before. Seeing the painting of the attack drove her mad, causing her to identify with the assailant and not the victim. Alberto likewise suffered from an induced psychosis, helping her cover up the murders and committing some himself. Sam and Julia are reunited and return to America.

Cast

Influences

Though Dario Argento is credited as the film's sole writer, the story closely follows the 1949 pulp novel The Screaming Mimi by American writer Fredric Brown. Argento was initially exposed to the book by director Bernardo Bertolucci, who was considering purchasing the film rights. Among the changes Argento made to Brown's story were a change of location from Chicago to Rome, making the killer the wife of an art dealer rather than an exotic dancer, and having the artwork that triggers her be a painting rather than a statuette. Brown's novel had previously been made into a Hollywood film, Screaming Mimi (1958), directed by Gerd Oswald.

The story is thought to have been influenced by the early Mario Bava giallo The Girl Who Knew Too Much (1963), which also involves a witness to a murder later realizing that the person they took to be the victim was actually the perpetrator. The killer's outfit of a black raincoat, hat and gloves, which would go on to become a standard giallo trope, was introduced in Bava's Blood and Black Lace (1964).

Release
The Bird with the Crystal Plumage was released in Berlin, Germany with a 94-minute running time at the Gloria-Palast on 24 June 1970. In Germany it was marketed as an adaptation of a Bryan Edgar Wallace story. It was released in the United Kingdom under the title The Gallery Murders.

Home media
The film was originally cut by 20 seconds for its US release and received a 'GP' rating, though it was later re-classified as 'PG'. The film was later released on DVD by VCI with the restored violence, but had problems with a sequence of shots referred to as "the panty removal scene". Later pressings fixed it. Blue Underground later obtained the rights and re-released the film completely uncut, adding an extra shot of violence previously unseen. The picture was completely restored and the sound was remixed into both 5.1 audio for both Italian and English tracks, but contained another soundtrack remixed into DTS-ES 6.1 Discrete in English.

Blue Underground released the film on Blu-ray Disc on 24 February 2009. Tech specs saw a BD-50 dual-layer presentation with newly remastered 1080p video and English audio tracks in DTS-HD Lossless Master Audio 7.1 Surround and Dolby TrueHD 7.1 Surround plus the original Italian audio track. It is now out-of-print. VCI announced on their Facebook page that they plan to release the film on Blu-ray Disc sometime soon and was released on September 12, 2013.

Arrow released the film on Blu-ray in the UK on June 13, 2011, but drew some criticism due to the film being cropped to 2.00:1 (which is director of photography Vittorio Storaro's current Univisium aspect ratio). In June 2017, Arrow re-released the film on a limited edition Blu-ray/DVD combo pack in the US and the UK containing a remastered 4K transfer from the original camera negative made exclusively for the release.

Critical reception
The Bird with the Crystal Plumage was relatively well received by critics. The New York Times wrote, "[It] has the energy to support its elaborateness and the decency to display its devices with style. Something from each of its better models has stuck, and it is pleasant to rediscover old horrors in such handsome new décor. " A number of American critics compared the film (favourably or unfavourably) to the thrillers of Alfred Hitchcock, such as Roger Ebert, who gave the film three out of four stars, writing, "it's a pretty good [thriller]", but that "its scares are on a much more basic level than in, say, a thriller by Hitchcock."

The film was nominated for an Edgar Allan Poe award for best motion picture in 1971.

The film was placed 272nd in Empire magazine's "500 Greatest Movies of All Time" list.

On the review aggregator website Rotten Tomatoes the film has an approval rating of 85% based on 40 reviews, and an average rating of 7.50/10. The website's critical consensus reads, "Combining a deadly thriller plot with the stylized violence that would become his trademark, The Bird with the Crystal Plumage marked an impressive horror debut for Dario Argento."

Impact
The Bird with the Crystal Plumage has been credited as a significant milestone in the popularization of the giallo genre. The genre is considered to date back at least as far as Mario Bava's 1963 film, The Girl Who Knew Too Much, but The Bird with the Crystal Plumage was the first giallo to achieve significant commercial and critical success. The film spawned a brief fad for gialli with similar verbose titles involving animals such as Black Belly of the Tarantula (1971), The Iguana with the Tongue of Fire (1971), and Don't Torture a Duckling (1972).

See also
 Vittorio Storaro filmography

Notes

References

External links 

 
 
 

1970 films
1970 horror films
1970s mystery films
1970s psychological thriller films
Giallo films
Italian horror films
1970s Italian-language films
English-language Italian films
1970s English-language films
Films directed by Dario Argento
Films scored by Ennio Morricone
1970s serial killer films
Films about fictional painters
Films based on American novels
Films based on thriller novels
Titanus films
Films set in Rome
Films about writers
Films with screenplays by Dario Argento
Constantin Film films
21st Century Film Corporation films
1970 directorial debut films
Italian serial killer films
Italian exploitation films
1970 multilingual films
Italian multilingual films
1970s Italian films